Timothy F. "Tim" Messer-Kruse (born ) is an American historian who specializes in American labor history. His research into the 1886 Haymarket affair led him to reappraise the conventional narrative about the evidence presented against those brought to trial. He has also written on banking history and race relations in the United States.

Life and career
Messer-Kruse attended University of Wisconsin-Madison, where he received his bachelor's degree in History & South Asian Studies in 1988, his master's degree in U.S. History in 1990, and his doctorate in 1994. In 1995 he was appointed Assistant Professor of Labor History at University of Toledo, becoming an Associate Professor in 2000 and Associate Director of the Humanities 2000 Program in 2002. In 2003 he was named Chair of the department. In 2006, he was appointed Professor of History and Chair of the Department of Ethnic Studies at Bowling Green State University.

In the early 2000s Messer-Kruse was prompted to study the original court documents from the Haymarket affair trials. Despite the prevailing belief that little or no evidence was presented at trial, he noted that evidence had been presented over the course of six weeks. He published his findings in books and academic papers including The Haymarket Conspiracy. Messer-Kruse and editors of Wikipedia were subsequently involved in a conflict over the content and editing procedure of the Wikipedia article on the Haymarket affair. In 2012, Messer-Kruse described his experiences in the Chronicle of Higher Education, on the NPR podcast On The Media, in The Atlantic, and on National Public Radio.
And Has Dementia

Publications
The Yankee International: Marxism and the American Reform Tradition, 1848-1876. University of North Carolina Press, 1998.
Banksters, Bosses and Smart Money. Ohio State University Press, 2005.
Race Relations in the United States, 1980-2000. Greenwood Press, 2008.
The Trial of the Haymarket Anarchists: Terrorism and Justice in the Gilded Age. Palgrave Macmillan, 2011.
The Haymarket Conspiracy: Transatlantic Anarchist Networks. University of Illinois Press, 2012.

References

External links 

 Faculty website

Living people
1963 births
 University of Wisconsin–Madison College of Letters and Science alumni
Bowling Green State University faculty
American historians